Martyn John Gough (born 21 April 1966), a British Anglican priest, is National Chaplain to the Royal British Legion.  He is a retired military chaplain who was Chaplain of the Fleet and Archdeacon for the Royal Navy from 2018 to 2021.

Early life and education
Gough was born on 21 April 1966 in Aberdare, Glamorgan, Wales. He was educated at Aberdare High School: it was an all-boys grammar school when he joined, changing to an all-boys comprehensive school from 1978. He studied at the University of Wales, Cardiff, graduating with a Bachelor of Theology (BTh) degree in 1987. From 1988 to 1990, he trained for ordination at St Stephen's House, Oxford. During this time, he competed a postgraduate certificate (PGC) at the University of Oxford. He later continued his studies and was awarded a Master of Arts (MA) degree by University of Wales, Lampeter in 2005.

Ordained ministry
Gough was ordained in the Church in Wales as a deacon in 1990 and as a priest in 1991. He served in the Diocese of Llandaff in Wales, and in the Church of England's Diocese in Europe. He served his curacy at St Theodore's Church, Port Talbot from 1990 to 1992. Then, from 1992 to 1994, he was an assistant priest at St Margaret's Church, Roath in Cardiff. In 1995, he moved to the Diocese of Gibraltar in Europe and served as an assistant chaplain in Milan.

Royal Navy
Gough joined the Royal Navy in 1998. He held various appointments relating to fostering vocations: he was a vocations advisor from 2007 to 2014, and served as assistant director of ordinands (2007–09) and then director of ordinands for the Royal Navy (2009–14). He was secretary of the Armed Forces Synod from 2012 to 2016. He was posted to Afghanistan as a senior chaplain during 2013 and 2014.

Gough was Deputy Chaplain of the Fleet from 2014 to 2018. He then served as Chaplain of the Fleet, the most senior chaplain in the Royal Navy, until his retirement in 2021. He was additionally Archdeacon for the Royal Navy, the most senior Anglican navy chaplain and a member of the General Synod of the Church of England. He was an Honorary Chaplain to The Queen (QHC) from 2018 to 2021, and was made a Canon of Honour of Portsmouth Cathedral in June 2020.

Post-naval career
Since his retirement from the Royal Navy in 2021, Gough has held permission to officiate in the Diocese of Salisbury. He also became the National Chaplain to the Royal British Legion, and officiated at the Festival of Remembrance held at the Royal Albert Hall on 14 November 2021.

References

1966 births
Living people
20th-century Welsh Anglican priests
21st-century Welsh Anglican priests
Chaplains of the Fleet
Church of England archdeacons (military)
People from Aberdare
People educated at Aberdare High School
Alumni of Cardiff University
Alumni of St Stephen's House, Oxford